is a 2011 Japanese jidaigeki film directed by Tetsuo Shinohara.

Cast
 Noriyuki Higashiyama as Sakunosuke Inui
 Rinko Kikuchi as Tazu
 Kataoka Ainosuke VI as Morie Sakuma
 Ryo Katsuji as Shinzō
 Machiko Ono as Ikuhisa
 Tatsuya Fuji as Chūzaemon Inui
 Chieko Matsubara as Ise
 Takashi Sasano as Gonnojō Sukegawa
 Tokuma Nishioka

References

External links
  
 
 Ogawa no Hotori (2011) at allcinema
 Ogawa no Hotori at KINENOTE

Jidaigeki films
Samurai films
Films directed by Tetsuo Shinohara
2010s Japanese films
2010s Japanese-language films